The New Territories East geographical constituency was the one of the five geographical constituencies in the Legislative Council of Hong Kong. It was established in 1998 for the first SAR Legislative Council election and was abolished under the 2021 overhaul of the Hong Kong electoral system. It encompassed Sha Tin District, Tai Po District, North District and Sai Kung District. In the 2016 Legislative Council election, nine members of the Legislative Council using the Hare quota of party-list proportional representation with 1,139,616 electorates in 2020.

History

The single-constituency single-vote system was replaced by the party-list proportional representation system for the first SAR Legislative Council election designed by Beijing to reward the weaker pro-Beijing candidates and dilute the electoral strength of the majority pro-democrats. Five seats were allocated to New Territories East, where popular democrat legislator Emily Lau of The Frontier topped the poll by winning more than 30 per cent of the popular vote with Cyd Ho also being elected. Although relatively weak in the region, the pro-democracy Democratic Party's Andrew Cheng also won a seat, while the pro-Beijing Democratic Alliance for the Betterment of Hong Kong (DAB) Lau Kong-wah whose Civil Force (CF) had a strong presence in Sha Tin District, also won a seat. The last seat was taken by former Legislative Council President Andrew Wong, beating pro-business Liberal Party chairman Allen Lee.

In the 2000 Legislative Council election, Cyd Ho switched to Hong Kong Island. Her vacancy was taken up by Democrat Wong Sing-chi who led a separate ticket targeting North District and Tai Po District, while Andrew Cheng targeted Sha Tin District and Sai Kung District. Two extra seats were added to New Territories East in 2004 election, in which the pro-democrats formed a star-dubbed "7.1 United Front" ticket which aimed at winning five seats riding on the pro-democracy wave from the 2003 mass demonstration. However only the first three candidates, Andrew Cheng, Emily Lau and Ronny Tong were elected, while the fourth candidate Wong Sing-chi was ousted. The DAB ticket also won two seats with Li Kwok-ying of the rural background also won a new seat. James Tien of the Liberal Party who was at the peak of his popularity from his opposition to the Basic Law Article 23 legislation contested in the constituency for the first time, while socialist activist "Long Hair" Leung Kwok-hung won the last seat, unexpectedly ousting Andrew Wong.

James Tien lost his re-election in the 2008 Legislative Council election as the Liberal Party's popularity declined, and was replaced by Wong Sing-chi. Leung Kwok-hung of the League of Social Democrats (LSD) rose to the top of the poll among the pro-democrats and Emily Lau dropped to the last. Lau decided to merge the Frontier into the Democratic Party after the party and became its vice chairwoman. In 2010  Leung Kwok-hung resigned from his office to trigger a by-election as part of the de facto "Five Constituencies Referendum" to pressure the government on the 2012 constitutional reform package. Leung was re-elected with a low turnout due to the government and pro-Beijing boycott, while Emily Lau's Democratic Party brokered a compromise with the Beijing authorities over the reform proposal, which increased the seats of the Legislative Council from 30 to 35, making the number of the seats in New Territories East from seven to nine.

In the 2012 Legislative Council election, the Democrats put forward an offensive strategy by fielding three tickets hoping to retain their current three seats. However with the radical democrats' ferocious attacks on their compromised position on the electoral reform, the Democrats retained only Emily Lau's seat while People Power's Raymond Chan and Neo Democrats' Gary Fan who quit the Democratic Party each won a seat. The DAB retained their two seats by splitting their ticket into two, each led by Chan Hak-kan and Elizabeth Quat. Fernando Cheung of the Labour Party and James Tien of the Liberal Party also returned to the Legislative Council through New Territories East.

Over the debate on the 2016/2017 constitutional reform proposal, Civic Party moderate Ronny Tong resigned over his difference with the party and triggered a February 2016 by-election. Although Civic Alvin Yeung defeated DAB's Holden Chow, Edward Leung of the pro-independence Hong Kong Indigenous (HKI) received a better-than-expected results which boosted the localist morale. Edward Leung was later on barred from running in the September 2016 general election an instead supported Youngspiration's Baggio Leung who was elected. While Lam Cheuk-ting succeeded Emily Lau who was retiring, New People's Party's Eunice Yung who was supported by Civil Force ousted Gary Fan.

Baggio Leung was soon disqualified from the office due to his oath-taking controversy, followed by Leung Kwok-hung who was also disqualified for his oath-taking manner. A by-election was held in March 2018, where Gary Fan made a comeback by defeating Tang Ka-piu of the pro-Beijing Hong Kong Federation of Trade Unions (FTU). However, Fan was later unseated by the court in December 2019, as the court viewed pro-independence candidate Ventus Lau's disqualification in the by-election was unlawful.

Returned members
Below are all the members returned for the New Territories East constituency since its creation. The number of seats increased from five to nine between 1998 and 2016.

Summary of seats won

Vote share summary

Election results
The largest remainder method (with Hare quota) of the proportional representative electoral system was introduced in 1998, replacing the single-member constituencies of the 1995 election. Elected candidates are shown in bold. Brackets indicate the quota + remainder.

2010s

2000s

1990s

See also 
 List of constituencies of Hong Kong

References 

New Territories
Constituencies of Hong Kong
l
1998 establishments in Hong Kong
Constituencies established in 1998
2021 disestablishments in Hong Kong
Constituencies disestablished in 2021